Monalisa Bagal  is an Indian actress best known for her work in Marathi film Zhalla Bobhata. Monalisa Bagal made her film debut in 2016 with film Prem Sankat directed by Datta Mirkute.

Career
Monalisa Bagul started her career with the Marathi film "Prem Sankat". She also appeared in Zhalla Bobhata followed by Dry Day movie.

Selected filmography

Television

References

External links

 
 https://in.bookmyshow.com/person/monalisa-bagal/1075058
 https://divyamarathi.bhaskar.com/entertainment/marathi-cinema/news/actress-monalisa-bagal-new-film-current-release-on-21-st-may-2021-127901697.html

Bagal,Monalisa
Actresses in Marathi cinema
Living people
Marathi actors
Actresses in Marathi theatre
Actresses in Marathi television
Indian television actresses
Indian film actresses
20th-century Indian actresses
21st-century Indian actresses
Indian stage actresses
1996 births